Pugled is a small settlement near Semič in southeastern Slovenia. It lies in the White Carniola part of the historical region of Lower Carniola. The Municipality of Semič is now included in the Southeast Slovenia Statistical Region.

Name
The name Pugled is derived from the Slovene word pogled 'bare hill with an open view' and referred to a landscape feature.

References

External links
Pugled at Geopedia

Populated places in the Municipality of Semič